Khrenovo is a rural locality (a village) in Kurilovskoye Rural Settlement, Sobinsky District, Vladimir Oblast, Russia. The population was 7 as of 2010.

Geography 
The village is located 14 km north-west from Kurilovo, 23 km north-west from Sobinka.

References 

Rural localities in Sobinsky District